Seelbach bei Hamm is a municipality in the district of Altenkirchen, in Rhineland-Palatinate, in western Germany. The Marienthal Abbey is located in the municipality.

References

Altenkirchen (district)